The 1998–99 Connecticut Huskies men's ice hockey team represented the University of Connecticut in the 1998–99 NCAA Division I men's ice hockey season. The team was coached by Bruce Marshall his eleventh season behind the bench at UConn. The Huskies played their home games at the Mark Edward Freitas Ice Forum in Storrs, Connecticut, competing in their first season in the Metro Atlantic Athletic Conference and first at the NCAA Division I level.

Standings

Schedule

|-
!colspan=12 style=""| Exhibition

|-
!colspan=12 style=""| Regular Season

|-
!colspan=12 style=""|

References

UConn Huskies men's ice hockey seasons
Connecticut
Connecticut
Connecticut Huskies men's ice hockey season
Connecticut Huskies men's ice hockey season